The Jonathan Larson Performing Arts Foundation was a foundation started in 1997 by the family and friends of Jonathan Larson, composer of the musical Rent.  From 1997 to 2008, the foundation awarded grants to musical theatre composers, lyricists and book writers.  Following the 2008 grants, the program was shifted to the American Theatre Wing, where it continues as the Jonathan Larson Grants.

References

External links
Jonathan Larson Grants

Arts foundations based in the United States
Arts organizations established in 1997
1997 establishments in the United States